Anna S. Fisher  (1873–1942) was an American artist and teacher. She was proficient in both watercolors and oil paints. The National Academy of Design included her works in 40 annual exhibitions between 1904 and 1942.

Biography

Fisher was born in Cold Brook, New York. She studied at Pratt Institute Art School in Brooklyn, New York, graduating in 1900.  She then taught at Pratt for forty years.

Fisher was a member of the American Watercolor Society; the National Academy Museum and School; the American Watercolor Society; the New York Society of Painters; Allied Artists of America; the National Arts Club and the National Association of Women Artists.

Fisher died in Cold Brook in 1942. The same year Pratt Institute held a memorial exhibition of her work.

Her work is in the collections of Pratt Institute Art School, the Brooklyn Museum, National Academy Museum and School, and the National Arts Club.

References

1873 births
1942 deaths
People from Herkimer County, New York
Pratt Institute alumni
Pratt Institute faculty
National Association of Women Artists members
19th-century American women artists
20th-century American women artists
American women academics